General elections were held in Luxembourg on 17 June 1984. The Christian Social People's Party remained the largest party, winning 25 of the 64 seats in the Chamber of Deputies. It formed a coalition government with the Luxembourg Socialist Workers' Party, the Santer-Poos government.

Results

References

Chamber of Deputies (Luxembourg) elections
Luxembourg
Legislative election, 1984
History of Luxembourg (1945–present)
June 1984 events in Europe